Lumding Assembly constituency is one of the 126 state legislative assembly constituencies in Assam state in North Eastern India. It is also one of the 9 state legislative assembly constituencies included in the Nagaon Lok Sabha constituency.

Members of Legislative Assembly

Election results

2021 results

2016 results

2011 results

2006 results

See also

 Lumding
 Hojai district
 List of constituencies of Assam Legislative Assembly

References

External links 
 

Assembly constituencies of Assam
Lumding